Hempsteade Neighborhood is a subdivision in southeastern Union, Kentucky, United States.  The north part of the neighborhood is adjacent to Mt. Zion Road (Kentucky Route 536), the south part of neighborhood almost borders Frogtown Road (KY 3060 east) but there is a small neighborhood in between, the east part of the neighborhood borders the estates that are along Gunpowder Road (Kentucky Route 237) and the west part of the neighborhood borders Hampshire neighborhood.

Neighborhood statistics

 Homes: 436 
 Land Area: 
 Population density: 1,348 people per square mile
 Median household income (2013): $107,736

References

Union, Kentucky
Neighborhoods in Kentucky